These Are the Days is a 30-minute Saturday morning animated series produced by the Hanna-Barbera studios and broadcast on ABC from September 7, 1974, to September 27, 1975.

Plot
Set at the turn of the 20th century in an old town called Elmsville located somewhere on the Great Plains, These Are the Days portrayed the everyday lives of the Day family, which consisted of a widow, her three children and her father, a self-styled inventor. Various family members interacted with friends and neighbors, with the story usually ending with a lesson learned.

Production
Due to the popularity of The Waltons, ABC decided to take a chance on an animated program set around the turn of the century. It was one of three "serious" programs the network aired on Saturday mornings in 1974, the others being the prehistoric live-action drama Korg: 70,000 B.C. and the animated family drama Devlin. These Are the Days and Devlin were among the very few dramatic programs ever produced by Hanna-Barbera, who were known primarily for slapstick comedies and action-adventure cartoons. (Warner Bros. has since acquired Hanna-Barbera Productions via Turner Entertainment, as well as Lorimar Productions, which produced The Waltons.)

Despite critical acclaim, however, These Are the Days was a ratings failure, as were Devlin and Korg: 70,000 B.C.; all three series were cancelled by the end of the year. These Are the Days continued in re-runs (only twelve original episodes were shown in the fall of 1974), with four new episodes shown in September 1975.

Cast
 Frank Cady as Homer
 Pamelyn Ferdin as Kathy Day
 Jack Haley as Danny Day
 Henry Jones as Jeff Day
 June Lockhart as Martha Day
 Andrew Parks as Ben Day

Episodes

References

External links

 
 Episode guide at the Big Cartoon DataBase

1974 American television series debuts
1975 American television series endings
1970s American animated television series
American Broadcasting Company original programming
American children's animated adventure television series
Animated television series about children
Animated television series about families
Television series set in the 1900s
Television series by Hanna-Barbera